Viva Purple is a line on the Viva bus rapid transit system in York Region, Ontario, Canada. The route primarily runs in an east–west direction along the Highway 7 Rapidway in Markham and Richmond Hill. It is operated by Tok Transit under contract from York Region.

Route description

Viva Purple operates along Highway 7 from Richmond Hill Centre Terminal in the west, to Cornell Terminal in the east.

Viva Purple also operates an 'A' branch service along Enterprise Boulevard between Town Centre Boulevard and Kennedy Road. Alternating buses serve this branch (and the Highway 7 branch) except during weekday rush hour.

Viva Purple connects with all other Viva lines except Viva Yellow and Viva Blue A. Currently, there are 27 stations along the bus route.

Notes
 Stop served by Enterprise branch only

 Stop served by Highway 7 branch only

 Eastbound only

Route history
Service from York University to Town Centre Boulevard began on September 4, 2005. Service extending from Town Centre Boulevard east to McCowan Road began October 16, 2005. Peak-time service west of York University began November 20, 2005. Service east of McCowan Road to Markham Stouffville Hospital was to begin on July 1, 2007, but was postponed to January 27, 2008. Service east of McCowan Road to Cornell will replace the aforementioned service. Service west of York University was discontinued as of September 2, 2007.

On September 2, 2018, Viva Purple was restructured to terminate at Richmond Hill Centre.

On September 5, 2021, the Viva Purple branch operating along Enterprise Boulevard was renamed as Viva Purple A. Trips continue to alternate between the Viva Purple (along Highway 7) and Viva Purple A (along Enterprise Boulevard) branches throughout the day.

On September 4, 2022, the eastern terminus was extended to Cornell Terminal.

Rapidway

The Viva Purple line has a dedicated right of way (dubbed Rapidways) for a portion of the route. Eventually, the entire Highway 7 Corridor could be upgraded to light rail transit.

References

Purple